is a 2015 South African Afrikaans-language drama produced by  based on novels by  (writing as ):  (It's me, Anna) and  (The State vs ).

At the tenth annual South African Film and Television Awards in March 2016,  was awarded the highest honour in the following categories:
 Best Feature Film
 Best Director of a Feature Film
 Best Actor in a Supporting Role
 Best Achievement in Script Writing
 Best Achievement in Production Design
 Best Achievement in Make-Up and Hair Styling

Characters 

 Anna: Protagonist in the movie and book. The entire book and movie revolve around her experiences with her father, stepfather, mother and several individuals. Ultimately it leads to her salvation as well as becoming a murderer.
 : Anna's little sister, She is raped and abused by her dad, until she comes to Anna and commits suicide.
 : Anna's stepfather. He is also responsible for beating and leaving  ( Junior) and is the reason that Anna's younger sister  commits suicide.
He was beaten and abused by his father until he decides to live with his biological mother. Later on he and Anna reconnect to heal the past.

References

External links

Afrikaans-language films
2015 films
Films based on South African novels
South African drama films